Anke Ohde (later Wegner, born 13 April 1955 in Malchin) is an East German sprint canoer who competed in the mid-1970s. She won five gold medals at the ICF Canoe Sprint World Championships with two in the K-1 500 m (1974, 1975), one in the K-2 500 m (1974), and two in the K-4 500 m events (1974, 1975). In 1976, she was displaced by fellow SC Neubrandenburg club member Carola Zirzow in the K-1. The Olympic nomination for the K-2 went to the world champions, Bärbel Köster and Zirzow. Ohde thus went to the 1976 Summer Olympics in Montreal as a canoeing reserve and did not compete. Ohde finished her active career after the Montreal Olympics.

References

Living people
1955 births
ICF Canoe Sprint World Championships medalists in kayak
East German female canoeists
People from Malchin
Sportspeople from Mecklenburg-Western Pomerania